Rekha Ratnakar is an Indian politician and member of the Bharatiya Janata Party. Ratnakar was a member of the Madhya Pradesh Legislative Assembly from the Agar constituency in Agar Malwa district.

References 

Living people
Year of birth missing (living people)
People from Agar Malwa district
Bharatiya Janata Party politicians from Madhya Pradesh
Madhya Pradesh MLAs 2003–2008